Dejobaan Games, LLC is an American video game developer based in Boston, Massachusetts. The company was founded in 1999 by Ichiro Lambe, and originally developed games for mobile devices, but has since branched out to other products for Microsoft Windows and OS X. They are currently working on a first-person shooter boss rush game titled Drunken Robot Pornography, procedurally generated content music game Drop That Beat Like an Ugly Baby, and art game Elegy for a Dead World.

Games

References

External links 
 

Companies based in Boston
Video game companies of the United States
Video game development companies
Video game companies established in 1999
1999 establishments in Massachusetts